The 1879 Massachusetts Aggies football team represented Massachusetts Agricultural College in the 1879 college football season. The team played its home games at Alumni Field in Amherst, Massachusetts. The team played its first football game and finished the season with a record of 1–0.

Schedule

References

Massachusetts
UMass Minutemen football seasons
College football undefeated seasons
Massachusetts Aggies football